Jonathan Ripley is an English writer, director, and producer of stage and screen.
Media work started in 1981 documenting the closure of the old Billingsgate fish market, then worked as researcher firstly on channel 4 TVs multi-cultural documentary series Rhythms 1982-3, for LWT and Central TV shows, then as assistant director on channel 4s Brookside and drama feature A Kind of English.

As Associate Producer on Fonteyn and Nureyev, Channel 4's 1985 Christmas Day Special nominated for the International Emmy, on Tyne Tees Television's 1988 feature documentary, Thunder Road, and Yorkshire Television's first Tuesdays 1987 documentary film featuring Surfing in south Wales.

As writer producer director
1989 feature film Spirit starring Paul Rhys. UK BBC2 Friday Night Movie Premiere 1996. Press - The Guardian "Eerie, out of the ordinary", TV Times "Successful mix of action, adventure and supernatural, compulsively watchable"
1992 Burning Ash, a short theatrical feature film starring Charlie Drake. nominated Madrid Film Festivals audience best picture. Press- The Observer "Wholly cinematic eco occult movie", Today "Oddly disturbing" 1993 microfilm Bosnia for UNHCR, global theatrical and TV distribution, Nominated for Best UK Advertising Award.
1992 Founder/Director of Medicine Hat Charity, Medicines for Bosnia and Croatia.
1998 stage play Last Train To Maraskaya at the London Pleasance Theatre and Horsham Studio Theatre. Reading comments- Soho Theatre "Beautifully executed, highly entertaining, Becket/Orton theatre of the absurd", Liverpool Playhouse "Brilliant, wonderful writing, combined real life with fantasy", Michael Hastings "Expressionistic mix of comedy and surrealism akin to Capek Brothers",
1999 Film Critics deem Jonathan Ripley as "The worst director I think I might have ever seen". Less harsh critics have said that "Jonathan Ripley is the epitome of mediocrity",

References
BFI
Hollywood.com 

New York Times
Variety
Yahoo

Living people
Year of birth missing (living people)
English writers
English male writers